Saloma was the stage name of Singaporean-Malaysian singer and film actress Salmah binti Ismail (1935–1983).

Saloma may also refer to:
 Saloma Link, pedestrian footbridge in Kuala Lumpur named after the actress
 Caesar Saloma (born 1960), Filipino physicist and former dean
 Saloma, Kentucky, United States, an unincorporated community
 Saloma, a style of music of Panama

See also
Salma (disambiguation)
Salome (disambiguation)
Shalom (disambiguation)
Salam (disambiguation)